Tibor Simon (1 September 1965 – 23 April 2002) was a Hungarian football player and manager.

Career
Simon, who played as a defender, spent his entire professional club career with Ferencváros, and also earned 16 caps at international level for Hungary, including three FIFA World Cup qualifying matches.

He also managed FC Sopron between 2001 and 2002.

Death
On 21 April 2002, Simon was beaten to death by security personnel outside a pub in Budapest, dying two days later. Three of the four men arrested for his murder were later freed.

References

1965 births
2002 deaths 
2002 murders in Hungary
Deaths by beating in Europe
Hungarian footballers
Hungary international footballers
Hungarian football managers
Ferencvárosi TC footballers
Budapesti VSC footballers
Male murder victims
People murdered in Hungary
FC Sopron managers
Hungarian murder victims
Association football defenders
Footballers from Budapest